Little Trout Pond is a lake located south of Horseshoe, New York. Fish species present in the lake are white sucker, lake trout, yellow perch, brook trout, and black bullhead. Access by bushwhack trail from Trout Pond on southeast shore.

References

Lakes of New York (state)
Lakes of St. Lawrence County, New York